Milward Rodon Kennedy Burge (21 June 1894 – 20 January 1968) was an English civil servant, journalist, crime writer and literary critic. He was educated at Winchester College and New College, Oxford. He served with British Military Intelligence in World War I and then worked for the International Labor Office and the Egyptian government. He was London editor of the Empire Digest and reviewed mystery fiction for The Sunday Times and The Guardian. He retired in the 1960s to West Sussex. Burge married Georgina Lee in 1921 and after her death married Eveline Schrieber Billiat in 1926. He also wrote under the pseudonym Evelyn Elder.

Kennedy specialised in police mysteries, but also wrote about the adventures of Sir George Bull, a professional private investigator. He also collaborated with other members of The Detection Club on The Floating Admiral and Ask a Policeman. His series characters are Sir George Bull and Inspector Cornford.

Bibliography
 The Bleston Mystery (1928) with A. G. Macdonell. As Robert Milward Kennedy
 The Corpse on the Mat (1929). Serialised in the US in 1930 as The Man Who Rang the Bell
 Corpse Guards Parade (1929)
 Half Mast Murder (1930)
 Death in a Deck-Chair (1930)
 Death to the Rescue (1931)
 The Floating Admiral (1931) with others
 The Murderer of Sleep (1932)
 Bull's Eye (1933)
 Ask a Policeman (1933) with others
 Corpse in Cold Storage (1934)
 Poison in the Parish (1935)
 Sic Transit Gloria (1936). Serialised in the US in 1936 as Scornful Corpse
 I'll be Judge, I'll be Jury (1937)
 It Began in New York (1943)
 Escape to Quebec (1946)
 The Top Boot (1950)

Short stories
The Illusionist. The Bystander, 4 September 1935
Through Glass, Darkly. The Bystander, Christmas Number 1935
One Performance Only. The Bystander, 8 April 1936
Mightier Than the Sword. The Bystander, 29 April 1936
Modern Antique. The Bystander, 11 November 1936
The Fur Coat. The Bystander, 18 August 1937
Death in the Kitchen
Fables of Forgetfulness No. 1: It Pays to Forget. The Bystander, 20 July 1938
Fables of Forgetfulness No. 2: A Regretful Lapse. The Bystander, 27 July 1938
Fables of Forgetfulness No. 3: Superstition. The Bystander, 3 August 1938
Why the Button?. The Bystander, 21 December 1938
The Man Outside. Adelaide Mail, 24 May 1952
Deadly Circle. Avon Argus & Cunderdin-Meckering-Tammin Mail, 25 September 1952
You've Been Warned. Sydney Morning Herald, 26 April 1954
The Operative Word. Aberdeen Evening Express, 18 September 1954

Short non-fiction
 The Rendezvous at the Rising Sun. Sunday Sun & Guardian, 14 July 1935

As Evelyn Elder
 Murder in Black and White (1931)
 Angel in the Case (1932) 
 Two's Company (1952)

Alumni of New College, Oxford
1894 births
English crime writers
1968 deaths